Chip Bolcik (born March 17, 1958) is an American voice-over announcer and narrator. He got his start in 1980 when one of his friends told an advertising executive about the silly messages Bolcik made on his answering machine. The executive called Bolcik's answering machine and left a message asking if he did voice-overs. Since then, Bolcik has done voice-overs for thousands of products. He is best known for narrating TruTV Presents: World's Dumbest..., which premiered in 2008.

References

External links

1958 births
American male voice actors
Living people